Cornelius William James Homan (17 August 1900 – 21 September 1979) was a Conservative Party politician in the United Kingdom who served as Member of Parliament (MP) for Ashton-under-Lyne from 1924 to 1928.

He was elected at the 1924 general election, after the constituency's Conservative MP Sir Walter de Frece stood instead in Blackpool.

However, he was disqualified in 1928 after being declared bankrupt. The resulting by-election on 28 October was won by the Labour Party candidate Albert Bellamy.

References

External links 
 

1900 births
1979 deaths
Conservative Party (UK) MPs for English constituencies
UK MPs 1924–1929
Members of the Parliament of the United Kingdom for Ashton-under-Lyne